Gayoso is a Spanish surname and may refer to:

People
Notable people with this surname include:
 Ander Gayoso (born 1993), Spanish footballer
 Javier Gayoso (born 1997), Filipino footballer
 Manuel Gayoso (born 1944), Spanish runner
 Manuel Gayoso de Lemos (1747–1799), Spanish military officer
 Roberto Trashorras Gayoso (born 1981), Spanish footballer

Places
 Gayoso, Missouri, United States